Malmesbury was a parliamentary borough in Wiltshire, which elected two Members of Parliament (MPs) to the House of Commons from 1275 until 1832, and then one member from 1832 until 1885, when the borough was abolished.

History 
The borough was represented in Parliament from 1275. The constituency originally returned two members, but representation was reduced to one in the Great Reform Act of 1832 until the constituency was finally abolished in 1885.

In the 17th century the constituency was dominated by the Earls of Suffolk, based in the family seat at nearby Charlton Park.

Members of Parliament

MPs 1275–1508 

From History of Parliament

MPs 1509–1558 
(Source: Bindoff (1982))

MPs 1559–1603 
Source:History of Parliament

MPs 1604–1640

MPs 1640–1832

MPs 1832–1885

Election results

Elections in the 1830s

Elections in the 1840s

Elections in the 1850s

Elections in the 1860s

Elections in the 1870s

Elections in the 1880s

Powell was declared dead after he disappeared when a hydrogen balloon he was travelling in was blown out into the English Channel and never seen again.

References 
Robert Beatson, A Chronological Register of Both Houses of Parliament (London: Longman, Hurst, Res & Orme, 1807) 
F W S Craig, British Parliamentary Election Results 1832–1885 (2nd edition, Aldershot: Parliamentary Research Services, 1989)
 J Holladay Philbin, Parliamentary Representation 1832 – England and Wales (New Haven: Yale University Press, 1965)

Notes 

Parliamentary constituencies in Wiltshire (historic)
Constituencies of the Parliament of the United Kingdom established in 1295
Constituencies of the Parliament of the United Kingdom disestablished in 1885